A Regular Girl is a lost 1919 American silent comedy film directed by James Young and starring comedian Elsie Janis. It was produced by Lewis J. Selznick.

The film had the working title Everybody's Sweetheart, a moniker associated with Janis as a vaudeville performer.

Cast
 Elsie Janis as Elizabeth Schuyler
 L. Rogers Lytton as Her Father (credited as Robert Lyton)
 Matt Moore as Robert King
 Robert Ayerton as Butler
 Tammany Young as Mac
 Ernie Adams as Shorty
 Jerry Delaney as Slim
 Frank Murdock as Red
 Jeffreys Lewis as Mrs. Murphy (credited as Mrs. Jeffreys Lewis)

References

External links

 
 Lobby card

1919 films
American silent feature films
Films directed by James Young
Lost American films
1919 comedy films
American black-and-white films
Films with screenplays by Frances Marion
Selznick Pictures films
Silent American comedy films
1919 lost films
Lost comedy films
1910s American films
1910s English-language films
English-language comedy films